The Catholic Church in Palau is part of the worldwide Catholic Church, under the spiritual leadership of the Pope in Rome. According to the last census (2000) 41.6% of the population belonged to the Catholic Church. Palau belongs to the Diocese of Caroline Islands, which is itself a suffragan to the Archdiocese of Agaña (Guam).

History
On April 28, 1891, Spanish Capuchin missionaries arrived to start a permanent Catholic presence on the island.

See also
Gregorio Ramarui
Sacred Heart Church, Koror

References

 
Palau
Palau